The 26th Parliament of the Turkish Republic was elected in a snap general election held on 1 November 2015 to the Grand National Assembly. It succeeded the short-lived 25th Parliament of Turkey later in November and lasted until July 2018. The 550 members, elected through proportional representation from 85 electoral districts of Turkey, are shown in the table below.

Members

References

Terms of the Grand National Assembly of Turkey
November 2015 Turkish general election

2015 in Turkish politics
Political history of Turkey